Germaine Tailleferre (born Marcelle Germaine Taillefesse; 19 April 18927 November 1983) was a French composer and the only female member of the group of composers known as Les Six.

Biography
Marcelle Germaine Taillefesse was born at Saint-Maur-des-Fossés, Val-de-Marne, France, but as a young woman she changed her last name from "Taillefesse" to "Tailleferre" to spite her father, who had refused to support her musical studies. She studied piano with her mother at home, composing short works of her own, after which she began studying at the Paris Conservatory where she met Louis Durey, Francis Poulenc, Darius Milhaud, Georges Auric, and Arthur Honegger. At the Paris Conservatory her skills were rewarded with prizes in several categories. Most notably, Tailleferre wrote 18 short works in the  Petit livre de harpe de Madame Tardieu for Caroline Luigini, the Conservatory's Assistant Professor of harp.

With her new friends, she soon was associating with the artistic crowd in the Paris districts of Montmartre and Montparnasse, including the sculptor Emmanuel Centore who later married her sister Jeanne. It was in the Montparnasse atelier of one of her painter friends where the initial idea for Les Six began. The publication of Jean Cocteau's manifesto Le coq et l'Arlequin resulted in Henri Collet's media articles that led to instant fame for the group, of which Tailleferre was the only female member.

In 1923, Tailleferre began to spend a great deal of time with Maurice Ravel at his home in Montfort-l'Amaury. Ravel encouraged her to enter the Prix de Rome Competition. In 1926, she married Ralph Barton, an American caricaturist, and moved to Manhattan, New York. She remained in the United States until 1927, when she and her husband returned to France. They divorced shortly thereafter.

Tailleferre wrote many of her most important works during the 1920s, including her First Piano Concerto, the Harp Concertino, the ballets Le marchand d'oiseaux (the most frequently performed ballet in the repertoire of the Ballets suédois during the 1920s), La nouvelle Cythère, which was commissioned by Sergei Diaghilev for the ill-fated 1929 season of the famous Ballets Russes, and Sous les ramparts d'Athènes in collaboration with Paul Claudel, as well as several pioneering film scores, including B'anda, in which she used African themes.

In 1931 she gave birth to her only child, daughter Françoise Lageat, with lawyer Jean Lageat. The couple married one year later and would later divorce in 1955 after years of separation.

The 1930s were even more fruitful, with the Concerto for Two Pianos, Chorus, Saxophones, and Orchestra, the Violin Concerto,  the opera cycle Du style galant au style méchant, the operas Zoulaïna and Le marin de Bolivar, and her masterwork, La cantate de Narcisse, in collaboration with Paul Valéry. Her work in film music included Le petit chose by Maurice Cloche and a series of documentaries.

At the outbreak of World War II, she was forced to leave the majority of her scores at her home in Grasse, with the exception of her recently completed Three Études for Piano and Orchestra. Escaping across Spain to Portugal, she found passage on a boat that took her to the United States, where she lived the war years in Philadelphia, Pennsylvania.

After the war, in 1946, she returned to her home in France, where she composed orchestral and chamber music, plus numerous other works including the ballets Paris-Magie (with Lise Delarme) and Parisiana (for the Royal Ballet of Copenhagen), the operas Il était un petit navire (with Henri Jeanson), Dolores, La petite sirène (with Philippe Soupault, based on Hans Christian Andersen's story "The Little Mermaid"), and Le maître (to a libretto by Ionesco), the musical comedy Parfums, the Concerto des vaines paroles for baritone voice, piano, and orchestra, the Concerto for Soprano and Orchestra, the Concertino for Flute, Piano, and Orchestra, the Second Piano Concerto, the Concerto for Two Guitars and Orchestra, her Second Sonata for Violin and Piano, and the Sonata for Harp, as well as an impressive number of film and television scores. The majority of this music was not published until after her death.

In 1976, she accepted the post of accompanist for a children's music and movement class at the École alsacienne, a private school in Paris. During the last period of her life, she concentrated mainly on smaller forms due to increasing problems with arthritis in her hands. She nevertheless produced the Sonate champêtre for oboe, clarinet, bassoon, and piano; the Sonata for Two Pianos; Chorale and Variations for Two Pianos or Orchestra; a series of children's songs (on texts by Jean Tardieu); and pieces for young pianists. Her last major work was the Concerto de la fidelité for coloratura soprano and orchestra, which was premièred at the Paris Opera the year before her death.

Germaine Tailleferre continued to compose right up until a few weeks before her death, on 7 November 1983 in Paris. She is buried in Quincy-Voisins, Seine-et-Marne, France.

Works
See List of compositions by Germaine Tailleferre

Selected bibliography

 Janelle Gelfand "Germaine Tailleferre (1892-1983) Piano and Chamber works," Doctoral Dissertation, 1999 University of Cincinnati College Conservatory of Music 
Laura Mitgang, ONE OF 'LES SIX' STILL AT WORK, NY Times May 23, 1982
 Laura Mitgang "Germaine Tailleferre: Before, During and After Les Six" in The Musical Woman, Vol. 11 Judith Lang Zaimont, editor (Greenwood Press 1987)
 Caroline Potter/Robert Orledge: "Germaine Tailleferre (1892-1983): A Centenary Appraisal" Muziek & Wetenshap 2 (Summer 1992) pp. 109–130
 Robert Shapiro "Germaine Tailleferre: a Bio-Bibliography" (Greenwood Press 1994) 
 Samuel Anthony Silva "In Her Own Voice: Exploring the Role of the Piano in the Deuxième Sonate pour Violine et Piano by Germaine Taillferre," Doctoral Dissertation, 2008 University of Memphis Rudi E. Scheidt School of Music
Genevieve McGahey "Is life not an eternal new beginning?':Uncovering Germaine Tailleferre's Marchand d'oiseaux", Undergraduate Music Honors Thesis, 2012, Swarthmore College; recipient of the Melvin B.Troy Prize in Music & Dance

References

Further reading

Women of Note: womenofnote.co.uk/
Classical Music Now- Musik Fabrik Musik Publishing Germaine Tailleferre at Classical Music Now

External links 

 
 

1892 births
1983 deaths
20th-century classical composers
Conservatoire de Paris alumni
Composers for piano
Concert band composers
French classical composers
French women classical composers
French film score composers
French women film score composers
Les Six
Neoclassical composers
French opera composers
People from Saint-Maur-des-Fossés
French ballet composers
20th-century women composers
20th-century French composers
20th-century French women musicians
Composers for harp